Fiji does not recognise same-sex marriage, civil unions or any other form
of recognition for same-sex couples.

Background

On 26 March 2013, Prime Minister Frank Bainimarama expressed opposition to the recognition of same-sex marriage. Answering a question raised by a caller on a radio talk-back programme, he stated that same-sex marriage "will not be allowed because it is against religious beliefs". In April 2013, a support group representing LGBT students, the Drodrolagi Movement, called for a discussion on the issue. In January 2016, Bainimarama reiterated his opposition to same-sex marriage, saying "there will be no same-sex marriage in Fiji" and suggested that lesbian couples seeking to marry move to Iceland.

In 2019, Bainimarama reiterated his opposition to same-sex marriage, saying, "As long as we are in government – Fiji will not allow same-sex marriage", because Fiji is a "God-fearing country". His stance was backed by the Catholic Church, the Methodist Church of Fiji and Rotuma and the Fiji Muslim League. The director of the Fiji Human Rights and Anti-Discrimination Commission, Ashwin Raj, said that "same-sex marriage is not a right" and that there needs to be more clarity on what the Constitution of Fiji states on the issue of same-sex marriage. Raj said "the priority must be towards addressing discrimination faced by the LGBTI community". He also called for "a calm and rational debate". The Fiji Coalition on Human Rights said it was "disappointed and disturbed" by the Prime Minister's stance, arguing that his remarks go against the basis of Fiji's laws and contradicted his commitment to the United Nations Human Rights Council.

The Methodist Church, the largest Christian denomination in Fiji, has been vociferously opposed to same-sex marriage and LGBT rights, arguing that homosexuality "threatens the stability of key institutions in Fiji's society" and violates "Christian standards of morality". Historically, prior to European colonisation and the conversion of the local Fijian population to Christianity by missionaries in the 19th century, Fijian society authorised homosexual activity through ritual or in the cultural practice of gender liminality. While they may be homosexual, gender-liminal males, known in Fijian as vakasalewalewa, are "deemed not to emphasise their sexual orientation as a fixed aspect of their identity but rather are seen to borrow a range of 'social and cultural attributes and symbols' from the opposite sex in ways that are 'foregrounded and backgrounded according to social context'". This "deeply embedded" tradition has been shaped by the Western introduction of "conservative Christian morality", and leading gender-liminal males to experience social marginalisation and discrimination today. The modern term , of Hindi origin, is used to collectively describe all non-heterosexual male-bodied people in Fiji.

Fijian-New Zealand activist Shaneel Lal has called on the Fijian Government to allow same-sex marriage. When asked to comment on the recognition of same-sex marriage in May 2022, spokespeople for the Unity Fiji Party, the Social Democratic Liberal Party and the National Federation Party said their parties had no official position on the matter.

Legal situation
Fiji family law does not provide legal recognition to same-sex marriages or civil unions. In 2002, the Marriage Act 1968 (Fiji Hindi: विवाह कानून 1968) was amended to state that "marriage in Fiji shall be the voluntary union of one man to one woman to the exclusion of all others". In May 2022, the director of the Fiji Human Rights Commission, Shaista Shameem, called on same-sex couples to challenge the Act in court. Shameem said the same-sex marriage ban may violate Article 26(3) of the Constitution, which bans discrimination based on sexual orientation:

Despite opposition from religious groups, protection against discrimination based on sexual orientation had been introduced in 1998; Fiji being among the first three countries in the world to adopt such a constitutional protection, alongside South Africa and Ecuador.

See also
LGBT rights in Fiji
Recognition of same-sex unions in Oceania

References

Fiji
LGBT in Fiji